Henry Wise may refer to:

 Henry Wise (gardener) (1653–1738), English gardener, designer, and nurseryman
 Henry Wise (merchant) (1802–1866), English mariner and merchant
 Henry Wise (publisher) (1835–1922), New Zealand publisher
 Henry A. Wise (1806–1876), Governor of Virginia, U.S. Minister to Brazil
 Henry A. Wise (attorney), United States Attorney for the Southern District of New York
 Henry A. Wise (New York state senator) (1906–1982), New York politician
 Henry Augustus Wise (1819–1869), author and U.S. Naval Officer
 Henry Seiler Wise (1909–1982), United States federal judge
 Henry Wise Jr. (1920–2003), American physician and World War II Tuskegee Airman fighter pilot
 Henry Christopher Wise (1806–1883), English politician
 Henry Wise (footballer) (born 2000), English professional footballer